Cape Roberts is a cape at the south side of the entrance to Granite Harbour on the coast of Victoria Land. Discovered by the South Magnetic Pole Party, led by David, of the British Antarctic Expedition (1907–09) and named for William C. Roberts, assistant zoologist and cook for the expedition.
 

Headlands of Victoria Land
Scott Coast